William Cates may refer to:
 William W. Cates, American philosopher, photographer, writer and vintner
 William Leist Readwin Cates, English lawyer and compiler of reference works
 	William Finnic Cates, namesake of the USS Cates